Mandya District is an administrative district of Karnataka, India. The district is bordered on the south by Mysore and Chamarajangar districts, on the west by Hassan District, on the north by Tumkur District and on the east by Ramanagara district. The district Mandya was carved out of larger Mysore district in the year 1939.

Mandya is the main town in Mandya District. As of 2011, the district population was 1,808,680 (of which 16.03% was urban).

Geography
Mandya district is located between north latitude 12°13' to 13°04' N and east longitude 76°19' to 77°20' E. It is bounded by Mysore district to the west and southwest, Tumkur district to the northeast, Chamrajnagar district to the south, Hassan district to the northwest, and Ramanagar district to the east. The administrative center of Mandya District is Mandya City.

Rivers
Mandya District has five rivers: Kaveri River and four tributaries main Hemavathi, Shimsha, Lokapavani, Veeravaishnavi.

Administrative divisions 

Mandya district consists of 7 taluks grouped under 2 subdivisions. The Mandya subdivision comprises Mandya, Maddur and Malavalli taluks, while the Pandavapura subdivision comprises Pandavapura, Srirangapatna, Nagamangala and Krishnarajpet Taluks.

Economy

Since Mandya is located on the banks of the river Cauvery, agriculture is the predominant occupation and the single largest contributor to Mandya's economy . The main crops grown are paddy 
sugarcane, jowar, maize, cotton, banana, ragi, coconut, pulses, and vegetables.

Transportation

Mandya district has an extensive road network. NH 275 and NH 948 NH 150A pass through the district.

Mandya belongs to "South Western Railways" of "Indian Railways". Mandya has many railway stations which are listed below:Mandya railway station.
Maddur railway station.
Pandavapur railway station.
Srirangapattana railway station.
BG nagar railway station.

Demographics
According to the 2011 census, Mandya district has a population of 1,805,769, roughly equal to the nation of The Gambia or the US state of Nebraska. This gives it a ranking of 263rd in India (out of a total of 640). Its population growth rate over the decade 2001-2011 was 2.55%. Mandya has a sex ratio of 989 females for every 1,000 males, and a literacy rate of 70.14%. Scheduled Castes and Scheduled Tribes make up 14.69% and 1.24% of the population respectively.

At the time of the 2011 census, 91.92% of the population spoke Kannada, 4.24% Urdu, 1.34% Tamil and 1.30% Telugu as their first language.

Notable people 
 Ambareesh - Film actor, politician
 Anasuya Shankar - known as Triveni, a novelist in Kannada language
 Jayalalithaa - 5th Chief Minister of Tamil Nadu, born in Melukote in Pandavapura taluk of Mandya district
 S M Krishna - Former Chief Minister of Karnataka, Former Governor of Maharashtra, Former External affairs minister of Govt of India
 K. S. L. Swamy - Film maker and actor
 Jayalakshmi Seethapura - folklorist and writer; born in Pandavapura taluk
 Mandya Ramesh - theatre and film actor
 Nagathihalli Chandrashekhar, filmmaker
 H. L. Nagegowda- folklorist, writer, founder of the museum 'Jaanapada loka', born in Nagamangala taluk
 P. T. Narasimhachar - poet from Melukote
 K. S. Narasimhaswamy - Kannada poet, born in Kikkeri, K. R. Pete taluk
 Prem - film director
 C S Puttaraju - Former Minor Irrigation Minister of Karnataka Government, Former Member of Parliament.
B. S. Ranga - film maker
 Ramya - South Indian actress and the youngest MP of India in the 15th Loksabha
H. R. Shastry - Veteran actor in Kannada
 Vijaya Narasimha- Kannada film lyricist from Pandavapura taluk
Shani Mahadevappa - veteran actor
 Malavalli Mahadevaswamy - popular folk singer 
B.S.Yediyurappa- Karnataka's 25th chief minister

References

External links

Official website of Mandya district
Mandya District profile
Mandya City Council -Mandya District at a glance

 
Districts of Karnataka
1939 establishments in India